Anthony Joshua Shaffer (15 May 19266 November 2001) was an English playwright, screenwriter, novelist, barrister, and advertising executive.

Early life
Shaffer was born to a Jewish family in Liverpool, the son of Reka (née Fredman) and Jack Shaffer, who was an estate agent with his wife's family. He was the identical twin brother of writer and dramatist Peter Shaffer, and they had another brother, Brian. He graduated with a law degree from Trinity College, Cambridge.

Career
Shaffer worked as a barrister and advertising copywriter before becoming a full-time writer.

Shaffer's most notable work was the play Sleuth (1970), which won the Tony Award for Best Play. The play was later adapted for the film version starring Laurence Olivier and Michael Caine. He received Edgar Awards from the Mystery Writers of America for both versions: for Best Play in 1971, and Best Screenplay in 1973.

His other major screenplays include the Hitchcock thriller Frenzy (1972) and the British cult thriller The Wicker Man (1973) with whose director, Robin Hardy, Shaffer had previously set up a television production company Hardy, Shaffer & Associates.

Personal life

Shaffer was married three times – to Henrietta Glaskie, Carolyn Soley (with whom he had two children, Claudia and Cressida), and Australian actress Diane Cilento.

Shaffer met Cilento in 1973, when she appeared in The Wicker Man. He moved to Australia in 1975 and married Cilento in 1985. Together they built a house (The Castle) and a theatre (The Karnak Playhouse). Shaffer was legally domiciled in Australia (where he owned land and a restaurant, paid taxes and voted in elections), although he did maintain a flat in London.

In the last years of his life Shaffer had an extramarital relationship with Marie Josette "JoJo" Capece-Minutolo when in London. Cilento did not accompany Shaffer to England but remained in Australia. After Shaffer's death, Capece-Minutolo made a claim on his estate in the British High Court, arguing that Shaffer had intended to divorce Cilento and marry her and that he had given her an engagement ring. The Shaffer estate argued that Shaffer had no desire to end his marriage to Cilento. The British judge found that despite Shaffer's being in "an intimate and loving relationship" with Capece in London,  Shaffer and his estate were not legally domiciled in the United Kingdom at the time of his death, and that therefore Capece-Minutolo had no legal claims on his estate, other than any bequest in Shaffer's will, which had been changed in 1999.

Bibliography

Novels

Plays

Memoir

Filmography

References

External links

The Life & Work of Anthony Shaffer
telegraph.co.uk
Obituary in The Guardian (8 November 2001)
nytimes.com

1926 births
2001 deaths
Alumni of Trinity College, Cambridge
British identical twins
Edgar Award winners
English Jews
English male screenwriters
Jewish dramatists and playwrights
Writers from Liverpool
English twins
English male dramatists and playwrights
20th-century English dramatists and playwrights
Burials at Highgate Cemetery
20th-century English male writers
20th-century English screenwriters